In integral calculus, Glasser's master theorem explains how a certain broad class of substitutions can simplify certain integrals over the whole interval from  to  It is applicable in cases where the integrals must be construed as Cauchy principal values, and a fortiori it is applicable when the integral converges absolutely. It is named after M. L. Glasser, who introduced it in 1983.

A special case: the Cauchy–Schlömilch transformation 
A special case called the Cauchy–Schlömilch substitution or Cauchy–Schlömilch transformation was known to Cauchy in the early 19th century. It states that if

 

then

 

where PV denotes the Cauchy principal value.

The master theorem 

 

then

Examples

References

External links 

 

Integral calculus